The Case of the Curious Bride is a 1935 American mystery film, the second in a series of four starring Warren William as Perry Mason, following The Case of the Howling Dog. The script was based on the 1934 novel of the same name by Erle Stanley Gardner, published by William Morrow and Company, which proved to be one of the most popular of all the Perry Mason novels.

The film marked Errol Flynn's first appearance in a Hollywood film. He appears twice, as a corpse and in flashback towards the end.

Plot
Rhoda Montaine learns that her first husband, Gregory Moxley, is still alive, which makes things awkward for her, since she has remarried Carl, the son of wealthy C. Phillip Montaine. She turns to Perry Mason for help, but when he goes to see Moxley, he finds only his corpse. Rhoda is arrested for murder.

Cast
 Warren William as Perry Mason
 Margaret Lindsay as Rhoda Montaine
 Donald Woods as Carl Montaine
 Claire Dodd as Della Street, Mason's secretary
 Allen Jenkins as Spudsy Drake, Mason's assistant
 Phillip Reed as Dr. Claude Millbeck
 Barton MacLane as Chief Detective Joe Lucas
 Wini Shaw as Doris Pender
 Warren Hymer as Oscar Pender
 Olin Howland as Coroner Wilbur Strong
 Charles Richman as C. Phillip Montaine
 Thomas E. Jackson as Toots Howard
 Robert Gleckler as Detective Byrd
 James Donlan as Detective Fritz
 Errol Flynn in his first-released American screen appearance, as Gregory Moxley
 Mayo Methot as Florabelle Lawson
 George Humbert as Luigi
 Henry Kolker as District Attorney Stacey

Production
Warner Bros announced they bought the film rights in May 1934. The same month they announced they had purchased the film rights to Captain Blood, which would also star Errol Flynn. Warners had earlier bought the rights to Gardner's Case of the Howling Dog and announced they would make the two films with Warren William as Perry Mason, with plans for an additional four films. Alan Crosland was originally announced as director but the job eventually went to Michael Curtiz.

Filming started early 1935. Errol Flynn, described as an "Irish leading man of the London stage" was signed in February.

Reception
The Chicago Daily Tribune praised the film's "laudable speed and suspense". The Los Angeles Times liked William's performance but thought his character "was almost too darn clever."

Filmink magazine said "The film is mostly worth seeing for the novelty of" Flynn's "American debut and seeing the serious-in-the-books-and-the-TV-series Perry Mason transmorphed into a wacky screwball hero."

Home media
On October 23, 2012, Warner Home Video released the film on DVD in Region 1 via their Warner Archive Collection alongside The Case of the Howling Dog, The Case of the Lucky Legs, The Case of the Velvet Claws, The Case of the Black Cat and  The Case of the Stuttering Bishop in a set entitled Perry Mason: The Original Warner Bros. Movies Collection. This is a manufacture-on-demand (MOD) release, available exclusively through Warner's online store and only in the US.

References

External links
 
 
 
 

1935 films
American black-and-white films
1935 crime films
1930s English-language films
Films directed by Michael Curtiz
American detective films
Warner Bros. films
Films based on American novels
Films based on mystery novels
1935 mystery films
American mystery films
Perry Mason
Films set in San Francisco
1930s American films
Films scored by Bernhard Kaun